"Futuristic Love (Elroy)" is a song by American hip hop recording artist Yung L.A. It was released as a single on April 7, 2009, by Grand Hustle Records and Interscope Records. The song, which was produced by Grand Hustle in-house production team Nard & B, features vocals from his then-Grand Hustle label-mate, Ricco Barrino. The song was originally released as the second single from Yung L.A.'s debut album Futuristic Leland, however the album would later be shelved. Since its release, the song has reached number 55 on the US Billboard Hot R&B/Hip-Hop Songs chart.

Music video
The music video for the song was directed by Va$htie and filmed in Atlanta, Georgia. A behind the scenes video was released on May 18, 2009. The video features cameo appearances from Killer Mike, Lil Duval and Big Kuntry King. The music video premiered on June 10, 2009. In the video, Yung L.A. is seen driving a car (spoofing the 1985 science fiction film Back to the Future), which takes Yung L.A. back in time to the 1990s and allows him to meet an attractive girl. After spending time with her, he then takes her back to the present.

Charts

References

External links
Yung L.A. ft. Ricco Barrino - Futuristic Love (Elroy) Music Video
Yung L.A. ft. Ricco Barrino - Futuristic Love (Elroy) Lyrics

2009 singles
Grand Hustle Records singles
Music videos directed by Vashtie Kola
Southern hip hop songs
Interscope Records singles
Dirty rap songs
American hip hop songs
2009 songs
Song recordings produced by Nard & B